Luigi Storero (18 October 1868 – 1956) was an Italian racecar driver and engineer from Torino.

He joined his father, Giacomo Storero's company (established 1850), which in 1884 started making bicycles.  Luigi Storero was a winner of bicycle races in 1887, and was involved in the selling of foreign makes.  A workshop was set up in Corso Valentino.

However, he is known mostly for automobile racing. He won the 1898 Torino-Asti-Alessandria in a De Dion Bouton tricycle. In 1899 he used this car to win Brescia-Cremona-Mantua-Verona.  Along his hometown friends Giovanni Agnelli and Carlo Biscaretti di Ruffia, Luigi Storero raced his own make, the Phénix 1.75HP tricycle; he won the 1899 Piacenza-Cremona-Borga-Cremona race.  Among the engineers in Storero's workshop was the very young apprentice Alessandro Cagno.

Driving Agnelli's Fiat 12HP, Storero won the Saluzzo Sprint in 1901 and the Targa Rignano 1902. In 1905 he established the Società garage Ruiniti Fiat-Alberti-Storero, a Fiat garage that was taken over by Fiat in 1908.  He left in 1910 and established the Storero Fabbrica Automibili carmaker in via Madame Cristina, active in the period 1912–19.

References

Italian racing drivers
Italian automotive pioneers
Sportspeople from Turin
1868 births
1956 deaths